During the 1999–2000 season, MSV Duisburg played in the 1. Bundesliga, the highest tier of the German football league system.

Season summary
After 3 years of top-half finishes, Duisburg were relegated in last place.

Players

First team squad
Squad at end of season

Left club during season

References

Notes

MSV Duisburg seasons
MSV Duisburg